Evaldas Dainys (born 29 September 1982) is a Lithuanian professional basketball player.

Dainys joined Neptūnas in 2005, moving to BC Lietuvos Rytas in 2009 and BC Rūdupis in January 2010. In 2011 summer returned to Neptūnas.

LKL statistics

References
 Evaldas Dainys. Lietuvos Krepšinio Lyga (Lithuanian Basketball League). Accessed 2011-01-26.

1982 births
Living people
BC Neptūnas players
BC Rytas players
BC Šilutė basketball players
Junior college men's basketball players in the United States
Lithuanian expatriate basketball people in the United States
Lithuanian men's basketball players
Point guards